Satanica is the fourth studio album by Polish extreme metal band Behemoth, released in 1999. Much of the music in this release is death metal with influences of black metal music, also commonly known as blackened death metal. It was recorded at the Starcraft Stimulation Studios and mastered in Warsaw, Poland in 1999.

Track listing
Regular CD and digipak

Double CD edition (bonus disc)
It is known that a limited edition double CD was released. The jewel case contains a second bonus CD with live tracks from Strasbourg, France, 26 February 1999.

Notes
 On some copies, track 1 is entitled as "Decade of ΘΕΡΙΟΝ" (ΘΕΡΙΟΝ is Greek for Therion). 
 On some copies, track 8 is entitled as "Chant for ΕΣΧHΑΤΟΝ 2000" (ΕΣΧHΑΤΟΝ is Greek for Eschaton).
 It is known that this album was released with 2 hidden tracks. The first hidden track #33 is an instrumental track, while #93 is a short non-instrumental track but containing lyrics which are nowhere to be found. The tracks 9–32, as well as tracks 34–92 are silent/blank tracks, lasting 0:04 each.

Personnel

 Behemoth
 Adam "Nergal" Darski – guitars, bass guitar, vocals, synthesizers, lyrics, mixing
 Zbigniew Robert "Inferno" Promiński – drums and percussions
 Leszek "L-Kaos" Dziegielewski – guitar

 Production
 Krzysztof Azarewicz – lyrics
 Katarzyna Brejwo – grammatical consultation
 Tomasz "Graal" Daniłowicz – cover design and artwork
 Marquis – logo
 Agnieszka Gafka – photography
 M.A. – co-producing, co-mixing
 Grzegorz Piwkowski – audio mastering

 Note
 Recorded at Starcraft Stimulation Studios. Mastered in Warsaw, 1999.

Release history

References

Behemoth (band) albums
1999 albums
Metal Mind Productions albums
Albums produced by Adam Darski